Hayato Katsuki (勝木隼人, born 28 November 1990) is a Japanese racewalker. In 2018, he won the gold medal in the men's 50 kilometres walk event at the 2018 Asian Games held in Jakarta, Indonesia.

At the 2018 IAAF World Race Walking Team Championships he won two medals: the silver medal in the men's 50 km event and the gold medal in the men's 50 km team event. In 2019, he competed in the men's 50 kilometres walk event at the 2019 World Athletics Championships held in Doha, Qatar where he finished in 27th place with a time of 4:46:10.

References 

1990 births
Living people
People from Ōnojō
Japanese male racewalkers
Athletes (track and field) at the 2018 Asian Games
Asian Games medalists in athletics (track and field)
Asian Games gold medalists for Japan
Medalists at the 2018 Asian Games
World Athletics Championships athletes for Japan
World Athletics Race Walking Team Championships winners
Athletes (track and field) at the 2020 Summer Olympics
Olympic athletes of Japan
20th-century Japanese people
21st-century Japanese people